Defending champion Rafael Nadal defeated Roger Federer in the final, 6–7(0–7), 7–6(7–5), 6–4, 2–6, 7–6(7–5) to win the men's singles tennis title at the 2006 Italian Open.

The final

Rafael Nadal recovered from the brink of defeat against Roger Federer to capture the Rome Masters and equal the record for consecutive wins on clay. Nadal came back from 1–4 down and saved two match points in the final set before triumphing 6–7(0–7), 7–6(7–5), 6–4, 2–6, 7–6(7–5). 

The win, which took over five hours, took Nadal to 53 straight wins on clay, matching Guillermo Vilas' record. It also put the 19-year-old level with Björn Borg on 16 titles won as a teenager. 

Federer, who had beaten Nadal only once in five attempts before the Rome Masters, started well, clinching a high-quality first set after playing a near-perfect tiebreak. And the world number one was on top for most of the second set but Nadal's trademark battling qualities kept him in it and out of the blue, he somehow earned a set point at 5–4. The teenager was unable to take that one but edged another tiebreak to draw level. 

The momentum was by now with Nadal and he looked to have made a decisive move when a break at 2–2 gave him the third set. He had chances to break early in the fourth set but the Spaniard let his struggling opponent off the hook and Federer made him pay. The top seed raced through the fourth set and took control of the decider by taking a 4–1 lead. The Rome crowd, including Prince Albert of Monaco and Omar Sharif, looked on in disbelief as first Nadal levelled at 4–4 then fought off Federer again at 5–6. Nadal's double fault, the first of the match from either player, helped Federer earn two match points but the world number one's usually reliable forehand failed him on both occasions and the Spaniard survived. 

Federer still had chances to win in the tiebreak which he led 5–3, in particular when he mishit a forehand which would have given him a 6–3 lead. However, Nadal underlined his talent on the dirt by clinching the tiebreaker and wrapping up his fifth win in six attempts over Federer.

Seeds
A champion seed is indicated in bold text while text in italics indicates the round in which that seed was eliminated.

Draw

Finals

Top half

Section 1

Section 2

Bottom half

Section 3

Section 4

Qualifying

Seeds

Qualifiers

Qualifying draw

First qualifier

Second qualifier

Third qualifier

Fourth qualifier

Fifth qualifier

Sixth qualifier

Seventh qualifier

Eighth qualifier

External links
Singles draw
Singles qualifying draw

Italian Open – Singles
Men's Singles